Helmut Noller (16 November 1919 – 28 March 2009) was a German sprint canoeist who competed in the early 1950s. He finished fourth in the K-2 1000 m event at the 1952 Summer Olympics in Helsinki.

References

Helmut Noller's obituary 

1919 births
2009 deaths
Canoeists at the 1952 Summer Olympics
German male canoeists
Olympic canoeists of Germany
ICF Canoe Sprint World Championships medalists in kayak